Sheikh Hasina Medical College, Tangail is a government medical school in Bangladesh, established in 2014. It is situated at the Kodalia Area of Tangail city.

History
In 2008, Before 9th Parliamentary Election of Bangladesh, Prime Leader of Bangladesh Awami League and nation's former prime minister Sheikh Hasina promised the people of Tangail to establish a government-financed medical school in Tangail city. As her party continued to rule as Government of Bangladesh for 2nd consecutive time in 2014, a decision was taken in August 2014 by the government to start Sheikh Hasina Medical College, Tangaill alongside five other new medical colleges (Jamalpur Medical College, Manikganj Medical College, Shaheed M. Monsur Ali Medical College, Patuakhali Medical College, Rangamati Medical College). SHMCT is the 24th public medical college of Bangladesh.

See also
 List of medical colleges in Bangladesh

References 

Medical colleges in Bangladesh
Hospitals in Tangail
Educational institutions established in 2014
2014 establishments in Bangladesh
Tangail City
Organisations based in Tangail